Ka with vertical stroke (Ҝ ҝ; italics: Ҝ ҝ) is a letter of the Cyrillic script. Its form is derived from the Cyrillic letter Ka (К к) by the addition of a stroke through the short horizontal bar in the centre of the letter.

Computing codes

See also
Cyrillic characters in Unicode

Cyrillic letters with diacritics
Letters with stroke